Christopher Cook is a Canadian playwright. They are most noted for the play Quick Bright Things, which was a Governor General's Award nominee for English-language drama at the 2020 Governor General's Awards.

Cook, who identifies as non-binary, is based in Vancouver, British Columbia, where they also work as a counsellor for LGBTQ people.

References

21st-century Canadian dramatists and playwrights
Canadian LGBT dramatists and playwrights
Canadian non-binary writers
Writers from Vancouver
Living people
Year of birth missing (living people)
21st-century Canadian LGBT people
Non-binary dramatists and playwrights